Pantin is a surname. Notable people with the surname include:

Carl Pantin (1899–1967), British zoologist
Dorothy Pantin (1896–1985), doctor and surgeon
Raoul Pantin (1943–2015), Trinidadian journalist, editor, poet, and playwright
William Abel Pantin (1902–1973), English historian
Yolanda Pantin (born 1954), Venezuelan poet and children's writer